Lewis Wharton MacKenzie CM, MSC, OOnt, CD (born 30 April 1940) is a Canadian retired major general, author and media commentator. MacKenzie is known for establishing and commanding Sector Sarajevo as part of the United Nations Protection Force (UNPROFOR) in the former Yugoslavia in 1992. MacKenzie was criticized for his role in the Somalia Affair and for Canada's peacekeeping failures in Bosnia. He was later a vocal opponent of NATO's involvement in the Kosovo War.

Biography
MacKenzie was born in Truro, Nova Scotia, the son of Eugene and Shirley MacKenzie (nee Wharton.) He was raised in nearby Princeport. He is named after his great uncle, Liverpool, Nova Scotia schooner captain Lewis Wharton. MacKenzie's forefather Israel Wharton fought as a United Empire Loyalist in the American Revolutionary War, taking part in the Battle of Waxhaws, before he subsequently settled in the Liverpool area.

Military career
MacKenzie enlisted with The Queen's Own Rifles of Canada and was commissioned in 1960. During his Canadian army career, MacKenzie served nine years in West Germany with NATO forces and had nine peacekeeping tours of duty with the United Nations in six different mission areas – the Gaza Strip (1963 and 1964), Cyprus (1965,1971 and 1978), Vietnam, Egypt, Central America (1990–91, commanding the United Nations Observer Mission) and the former Yugoslavia (1992–1993).

Between peacekeeping missions MacKenzie served as an instructor at the Canadian Forces Command and Staff College (1979–82) and as director of army training at St. Hubert, Que. (1983–85). As commander of the Canadian Forces Base in Gagetown, N.B. (1988–90) he was responsible for training officers at the Combat Training Centre. In 1985, he was appointed director of Combat-Related Employment for Women and, in 1991, he was appointed deputy commander of the Canadian Army's Land Force Central Area.

Following his return from the Balkans in October 1992, MacKenzie was appointed commander of the army in Ontario. He retired from the Canadian Forces in 1993, after a 35-year career.

He was the first Canadian, military or civilian, to be awarded a second Meritorious Service Cross. The second was Brigadier-General Guy Laroche in October 2010.

Somalia Affair
Lewis MacKenzie was criticised by the Somalia Commission of Inquiry for his contribution to the Somalia Affair after Canadian Forces in Somalia committed human rights abuses and breaches of international humanitarian law and members of the Canadian command were found to have engaged in a subsequent cover-up.

The Commission observed that MacKenzie testified in an honest and straightforward manner; it did not always accept everything that he said but accepted that he offered the truth as he saw it. It found that his superiors' desire to parade his successes as a bona fide hero of the Canadian Forces had impaired his ability to supervise and control matters that were his core responsibilities.

The Commission found that MacKenzie had failed adequately to investigate the significant leadership and discipline problems in the Canadian Airborne Regiment, to inform himself of the problems and to take decisive remedial steps to ensure they were adequately resolved. In addition, it found that he did not adequately monitor the Regiment's training to ensure its development as a cohesive unit or make adequate provisions for the troops to be trained or tested on its newly developed Rules of Engagement and failed to direct and supervise the training of the Canadian Joint Force Somalia personnel in the Law of Armed Conflict for peace support operations.

The Commission further ruled that MacKenzie had important obligations as a commander and so bore responsibility for the failures that attached to the discharge of those obligations. His role was pivotal and despite the fact that he was necessarily absent from his post due to obligations condoned by his superiors, errors in the chain of command below him remained his responsibility and flowed upwards from him to the highest levels of the command structure.

Bosnian War

In February 1992, MacKenzie was named chief of staff of the United Nations peacekeeping force in former Yugoslavia, tasked with supervising the cease-fire in Croatia. The force headquarters were located in Sarajevo, the capital of Bosnia and Herzegovina. In April 1992, the Bosnian war broke out. MacKenzie created and assumed command of the peacekeeping force's Sector Sarajevo in May 1992. He used his UN force to open Sarajevo Airport for the delivery of humanitarian aid. Using the media as a means of trying to help restore peace, MacKenzie became an international celebrity.

MacKenzie returned from the Balkans in October 1992 in controversial circumstances. As a member of the Canadian armed forces he was precluded from commenting on government policy. After criticising the United Nations' inability to command, control, and support its peacekeeping forces, he retired from the military in March 1993.

He has since written and lectured on his experiences in the former Yugoslavia questioning the numbers killed in the Srebrenica massacre, an event that came after his period of service in the area. He has challenged the findings of the International Criminal Tribunal for the former Yugoslavia (ICTY) and, in 2005, contested the conclusions and reasoning of the Appeal Chamber's 2004 judgment in the Krstić case that the crime of genocide was perpetrated at Srebrenica in July 1995.
He has also disputed that Srebrenica ever was a UN Safe area, and argued that the demilitarization requirements imposed on both the Serb side (surrounding Srebrenica) and the Bosniak side (inside the enclave) were never fulfilled.

Srđa Pavlović of the University of Alberta, a Serbian-Montenegrin historian specializing in the political and cultural history of the South Slavs during the 19th and 20th centuries, wrote that "(s)ince mid-1990s the denying of the Srebrenica genocide has been a main feature of all of General MacKenzie's public addresses on the breakup of Yugoslavia", adding that the "majority of scholars specializing in the Balkan history and the breakup of Yugoslavia view Major General MacKenzie as a promoter of a narrative that denies Serbia's responsibility in that bloody breakup and as someone who disputes the evidence of genocide committed in Srebrenica that was presented to the ICTY in The Hague"
The 2000 book The Lion, the Fox, and the Eagle by Carol Off, which devotes a third of its content to MacKenzie's role in Yugoslavia, claims that MacKenzie was willfully ignorant of the Bosnian political situation and was manipulated into being a vehicle of pro-Serb propaganda. In 1993, investigative reporter and Pulitzer Prize–winning journalist Roy Gutman accused Mackenzie of having two trips to Washington D.C., one to speak in front of the Heritage Foundation and the other to appear as an expert witness for the House of Representatives Armed Services Committee, funded by SERBNET, a Serbian-American lobbyist group. In a telephone interview with Gutman, MacKenzie responded, "It wouldn't surprise me if there was some Serbian involvement considering who initiated the contract; however I would be very disappointed if that were the case." The day after the interview, an article appeared in Newsday suggesting that MacKenzie was on the Serbian payroll. When MacKenzie confirmed the source of the funds was indeed SERBNET, he donated the entire fee to the Canadian Federation of Aids Research (CANFAR). However, UN officials ultimately criticised his "lack of judgment" in the matter.

Post-Military

Media
MacKenzie is the author of two books:
 Peacekeeper: Road to Sarajevo
 Soldiers Made Me Look Good: A Life in the Shadow of War
and also writes short essays about military affairs, most often in The Globe and Mail:
 "We can help in Mali without putting ‘boots on the ground’" 23 Jan 2013
 "The road to Damascus goes through Moscow" 22 Feb 2012
 "NATO's Libya 'hope' strategy is bombing" 10 Jun 2011
He is frequently sought by Canadian broadcast media as a security and military affairs commentator:
 "Cracks showing in NATO's Libya strategy" 22 Jun 2011
 "As politicians hit hustings, Canada's Libya mission flies under the radar" 24 Mar 2011
 "Tories let election skirmishes eclipse war in Libya" 29 Mar 2011
 "Daniel Ménard scandal leaves military reeling" 30 May 2010

In 2005, following the appointment of former Lieutenant-General Roméo Dallaire as a Liberal senator, MacKenzie wrote an editorial in The Globe and Mail entitled "Roméo, Roméo, wherefore art thou partisan?" arguing that Dallaire had compromised his previous stance by endorsing the Liberal Party's position on intervention in Sudan.

On 19 April 2010, MacKenzie was interviewed on CTV's Power Play in relation to accusations by Ahmadshah Malgarai, a translator, who witnessed interrogations in which a witness allegedly recounted that the Canadian military murdered a 17-year-old Afghan. MacKenzie dismissed those accusations as "crap" and "insulting" to the Canadian military, while he viewed the denial by the Canadian military as credible. Amir Attaran, a law professor and lawyer for Malgarai disagreed with Mackenzie, arguing that instead of comparing credibility, the military must release the records of detainee interrogations to Parliament, so that Parliament may determine what occurred, based upon the available facts. According to Attaran, it is a legal requirement that the documents regarding detainee interrogations be produced, while they need not be made public. MacKenzie called it "ridiculous" and "ludicrous" to table such documents in Parliament and that, furthermore, he was "not concerned" about the legal requirement to do so. Near the end of the interview, MacKenzie verbally attacked Dr. Attaran: "Last time I checked, in various polls being done across Canada, the Canadian Forces are at the very top of trustworthiness with the Canadian population. I won't mention where lawyers were slated."

MacKenzie is interviewed in two documentary films by Serbian-Canadian film-maker Boris Malagurski: Kosovo: Can You Imagine? (2009) and The Weight of Chains (2011). He also contributed to the Canadian documentary If I Should Fall, which focuses on the Canadian military experience in Afghanistan since 9/11.

In 2021, Mackenzie was announced as the Honorary Commander of the Fort Henry Guard, based out of Fort Henry National Historic Site in Kingston, Ontario.

Politics
In the 1997 federal election, MacKenzie was Progressive Conservative candidate for Parliament for the central Ontario riding of Parry Sound—Muskoka. Tory leader Jean Charest suggested that if their party won power, MacKenzie would become Deputy Prime Minister. The Tories improved their standing and regained official party status, though MacKenzie finished second to Liberal incumbent Andy Mitchell.

Electoral record

Leisure activities

MacKenzie is a lifelong automobile racing enthusiast. According to an article in the 23 September 2007 Victoria Times Colonist, he is an enthusiastic, skilled, and competitive race car driver having won the 2007 Diamond Class Ontario championship for Formula Fords at the age of 67.

Honours
MacKenzie is a recipient of the Vimy Award, which recognizes a Canadian who has made a significant and outstanding contribution to the defence and security of the nation and the preservation of its democratic values.

In 2006, he was made a Member of the Order of Canada.

References

United Nations Protection Force soldiers
1940 births
Living people
Canadian Army officers
Canadian generals
Canadian non-fiction writers
Canadian people of German descent 
Canadian people of Scandinavian descent 
Canadian people of Scottish descent
Members of the Order of Ontario
Members of the Order of Canada
Recipients of the Meritorious Service Decoration
United Nations personnel in the Bosnian War
People from Colchester County

People from Truro, Nova Scotia
Queen's Own Rifles of Canada soldiers
Canadian officials of the United Nations
Deniers of the Bosnian genocide
Queen's Own Rifles of Canada officers